The Norsk Syndikalistisk Forbund (Norwegian Syndicalist League) is an anarcho-syndicalist group in Norway. It is the Norwegian section of the International Workers' Association, and was mandated as the secretariat of the International until 2007, when the Serbian section Anarho-sindikalisticka inicijativa (ASI-MUR) took over.

History
The NSF was originally established in 1916, and joined the IWA the year after it was founded, in 1923. Originally it counted thousands of members, but this membership drifted away. The NSF was unable to operate openly while the Nazis occupied Norway, but did carry on a clandestine existence. It has been present at all post-war IWA Congresses and maintains a hard defence of the IWA to this day.

Recent activities
NSF members are active in international solidarity, such as for the recent strike of the Spanish Confederación Nacional del Trabajo at Mercadona supermarkets and in fighting for anarcho-syndicalist methods of organisation amongst workers in Norway.

References

External links

European trade union federations
International Workers' Association
Anarchist organizations in Europe
Syndicalist trade unions
Anarchism in Norway